Richard Albrecht (born 1950) is an English actor, director, producer and writer. His work include all facets of British theatrical life: commercials, corporates, film, narration, television, theatre and voice-over.

Trained at the E15 Acting School (1967–70), he then went into repertory theatre at Oldham, Lincoln, Birmingham, Nottingham, Newcastle, Leicester, Greenwich, Colchester, Salisbury and Cheltenham. Touring theatre with Pentabus, Bristol Express, Monstrous Regiment, Shared Experience. Fringe Theatre with the Combination, Soho Poly, Traverse, Young Vic, Stratford East, a one-man show RIP Maria Callas at the Edinburgh Festival. West End Happy as a Sandbag. Richard appeared at the Royal Court Theatre in Ashes and Sand and My Child.

TV appearances include Coronation Street, EastEnders, Casualty, The Bill, King Lear, Threads, Doctors, Agatha Christie's Poirot, Heartbeat, Where The Heart is and Holby City.

Films include Jude, The Man Who Cried and the recently completed The Glasshouse. Voice work includes narrating Wainwright-the Man Who Loved the Lakes, 17 episodes of Extraordinary Animals and the kids cartoon/film of Badly Drawn Roy. Latest theatre appearance was in Independent Means at the Library Theatre, Manchester.

Richard is president of the North London Guinea Pig Fanciers Society and strives to breed the perfect guinea pig in his spare time. His other hobbies include men's netball (in which he represented England in his youth), foraging for mushrooms and crocheting doilies.

Filmography 
 Walking with the Enemy (2013)
The Man Who Cried
Jude

References

External links

Richard Albrecht Official Site

1950 births
Living people
20th-century English male actors
21st-century English male actors
English male film actors
English male soap opera actors
English male stage actors
Male actors from Manchester